Do Tuvali  (also Romanized as Do Tūvalī and Dotūvalī) is a valley in Tashan Rural District, Riz District, Jam County, Bushehr Province, Iran. At the 2006 census, its population was 25, in 4 families. The name Do Tuvali can be thought of as a combination of Doto + Valley (the valley of Doto). Such linguiustic pattern is only accidental. Dotovalley is a U shape valley. Zagross mountain range, locally called Pakemar, streches beyond Dotovalley. Shaded by the Lime and Palm gardens, Dotovalley is a popular destination for those who want to fulfill the needs of the soul.

References 

Populated places in Jam County